The 2011 GCC U-17 Championship took place in Qatar from August 5 to August 15. It was the 8th edition of the tournament.

UAE were the defending champions. Saudi Arabia won the tournament for the third time.

Groups

Group stage

Group A

All times are local (UTC+3)

Group B

All times are local (UTC+3)

Semi finals

Fifth place playoff

Third place playoff

Final

Winners

References

See also 
Football at the Southeast Asian Games
AFC
AFC Asian Cup
East Asian Cup
Arabian Gulf Cup
South Asian Football Federation Cup
West Asian Football Federation Championship

Gulf
2011
GCC U-17 Championship
2011 in youth association football